William James Ithell (7 February 1916 – 3 January 1986) was a Welsh professional footballer who played as a centre half in the Football League for Swindon Town. He later managed in non-League football.

Personal life 
Ithell served in 53rd (Bolton) Field Regiment, Royal Artillery, during the Second World War.

Career statistics

References

English Football League players
1916 births
1986 deaths
Welsh footballers
People from Hawarden
Sportspeople from Flintshire
Association football wing halves
Bolton Wanderers F.C. players
Swindon Town F.C. players
Boston United F.C. players
Southern Football League players
Boston United F.C. managers
Poole Town F.C. managers
Chippenham Town F.C. managers
British Army personnel of World War II
Royal Artillery personnel
Welsh football managers
Military personnel from Flintshire